Carla Sinclair (born August 15, 1964) is an American writer and journalist. She is of Western European and Armenian descent. She is co-founder of the collaborative weblog Boing Boing. Along with her husband, Mark Frauenfelder, she founded the bOING bOING print zine in 1988, where she acted as editor until the print version folded in 1997. She wrote the book Net Chick, was author of the cyberculture thriller Signal to Noise, as well as four other published books. She was editor-in-chief at Craft magazine for O'Reilly Media. She is the older sister of adult actress Christy Canyon.

On June 21, 2003, Sinclair and Frauenfelder, along with their two young daughters, decided to move from Los Angeles to Rarotonga, an island in the South Pacific, where they lived for five months. The Island Chronicles is a website about the adventures. They are currently based in California.

References

Further reading

External links
The Island Chronicle

1964 births
Living people
American bloggers
American women journalists
American women writers
American writers of Italian descent
American people of Armenian descent
21st-century American non-fiction writers
American women bloggers
21st-century American women writers